Diodora dysoni, common name Dyson's keyhole limpet, is a species of small sea snail or limpet, a marine gastropod mollusk in the family Fissurellidae, the keyhole limpets.

Description
The size of the shell varies between 12 mm and 28 mm.

Distribution
This species occurs in the Gulf of Mexico, the Caribbean Sea and the Lesser Antilles; in the Atlantic Ocean from the Bahamas to Brazil.

References

 Dall, W. H. 1927. Diagnoses of undescribed new species of mollusks in the collection of the United States National Museum. Proceedings of the United States National Museum 70(2668): 1–11
 Turgeon, D.D., et al. 1998. Common and scientific names of aquatic invertebrates of the United States and Canada. American Fisheries Society Special Publication 26 page(s): 58
 Rosenberg, G., F. Moretzsohn, and E. F. García. 2009. Gastropoda (Mollusca) of the Gulf of Mexico, Pp. 579–699 in Felder, D.L. and D.K. Camp (eds.), Gulf of Mexico–Origins, Waters, and Biota. Biodiversity. Texas A&M Press, College Station, Texas.

External links
 

Fissurellidae
Gastropods described in 1850